The School Certificate is an academic qualification in Mauritius awarded upon the completion of Form 5, the penultimate stage of secondary school. The qualification is awarded upon earning passing marks on the O-level exams administered by the Mauritius Examinations Syndicate, in conjunction with the University of Cambridge Local Examinations Syndicate of the Cambridge International Examinations board.

Subjects 

Typically around 8 to 10 subjects are chosen by the student to be studied at O-level. These subjects may determine the available options for future study at A-level, to be taken for the Higher School Certificate, and for tertiary study in higher education institutions. 

Cambridge School Certificate candidates may take the following subjects at O-level:

Progression
Students who successfully earn the qualification may then progress to study for the A-level examinations and earn the Higher School Certificate. Students who are unsuccessful in obtaining the qualification may then transition from the academic stream to the vocational stream and progress onto vocational programmes of study. Students may also choose to obtain IGCSE qualifications at a later time.

See also 
 Education in Mauritius
 Form III Certificate
 Certificate of Primary Education
 Higher School Certificate (Mauritius)

References 

Education in Mauritius
Secondary school qualifications